Best is the first greatest hits album by Japanese band Garnet Crow. It was released on 26 October 2005 under Giza Studio.

Background
The album was released as promotion for the band 5th anniversary of debut.

Album includes all 18 chronologically released singles released - from debut single Mysterious Eyes until Kimi no Omoi Kaita Atsumeru Heaven.

The album also includes various tracks from their studio albums and b-side tracks from singles, such as Mizu no Nai Hareta Umi e or Mikanseina Neiro.

New unreleased song,  Sora Iro Neko, was originally performed by Sayuri Iwata.

Sayonara to Tatta Hitokoto de was introduced for the first time in their live tour GARNET CROW livescope 2005 ~I'm waiting 4 you & live~ before the official recording release.

The hidden track includes live recording of Yume wo Mita Ato de from their live tour  GARNET CROW livescope 2004 -Kimi to Iu Hikari-

Their 18th single, Kimi no Omoi Egaita Yume Atsumeru Heaven was exclusively included in this album, it never appeared in any studio album, however in 2013 it appears in the best of album The One: All Singles Best.

Commercial performance
The album reached #4 in its first week and sold more than 55,000 copies. The album charted for 13 weeks and totally sold 108,703 copies.

Track listing
All songs were composed by Yuri Nakamura, written by Nana Azuki and arranged by Hirohito Furui.

Disc one

Disc two

Personnel
Credits adapted from the CD booklet of Best.

Yuri Nakamura - vocals, composing, backing vocals
Nana Azuki - songwriting, keyboard
Hirohito Furui - arranging, keyboard
Hitoshi Okamoto - acoustic guitar, bass, backing vocals
Miguel Sá Pessoa - arranging
Michael Africk - backing vocals
Yoshinobu Ohga (OOM) - guitar
Yuuichiro Iwai (U-ka Saegusa in dB) - acoustic guitar
Masato Ohashi (Feel so bad) - bass
David C.Brown - drums

Keisuke Kurumatani (U-ka Saegusa in dB) - drums, label management
Katsuyuki Yoshimatu - recording engineer
Aki Morimoto - recording engineer
Akoi Nakajima - mixing engineer
Takayuki Ichikawa - mixing engineer
Tomko Nozaki - mixing engineer
Masahiro Shiamda - mastering engineer
Mods House - art direction
Kanonji - executive producer

In media
Mysterious Eyes - opening theme for Anime television series Detective Conan
Futari no Rocket - campaign theme song for MFTV
Sen Ijō no Kotoba wo Narabete mo - commercial song for Dome
Natsu no Maboroshi - ending theme for Anime television series Detective Conan
flying - opening theme for PlayStation game Tales of Eternia
Last Love Song - ending theme for TV Asahi program Beat Takeshi's TV Tackle
Call my name - ending theme for Anime television series Project ARMS
Timeless sleep - ending theme for Anime television series Project ARMS
Yume Mita Ato de - ending theme for Anime television series Detective Conan
Holy Ground - ending theme for Nihon TV program Bakushou Mondai no Susume
Spiral - theme song in Fuji TV program Sport!
Crystal Gauge - ending theme in TBS program Pooh!
Nakenai Yoru mo Nakanai Asa mo - ending theme for Fuji TV program Uchimura Produce
Kimi to Iu Hikari - ending theme for Anime television series Detective Conan
Eien wo Kakenukeru Isshun no Bokura - ending theme for Tokyo Broadcasting System Television program Sunday Japan
Bokura Dake no Mirai - theme song for Fuji TV program Sport!
Kimi wo Kazaru Hana wo Sakasou - ending theme for Anime television series Monkey Turn
Wasurezaki - ending theme for Anime television series Detective Conan
Kimi no Omoi Egaita Yume Atsumeru Heaven - opening theme for Anime television series MÄR

References

Being Inc. compilation albums
Garnet Crow albums
Giza Studio albums
2006 compilation albums
Japanese-language compilation albums
Albums produced by Daiko Nagato